Ham Christian Centre is an Evangelical church in Lock Road, Ham in the London Borough of Richmond upon Thames. It is a member of the South East Gospel Partnership.

History
The church was built in 1928 as the Ham Free Evangelical Church. Services ceased in 1979 but it has operated in its current form since the building was renovated in 1998 by the Duke Street Church, Richmond.

Church activities
The church has a service on Sunday mornings. Prayer meetings are usually held in homes. .

Community use
The church premises are also used by the community.

References

External links
South East Gospel Partnership

1928 establishments in England
Baptist churches in the London Borough of Richmond upon Thames
Churches in Ham, London
Religious buildings and structures completed in 1928